Lajos Kovács may refer to:

 Lajos Kovács (actor), Hungarian actor
 Lajos Kovács (footballer), Hungarian footballer and manager
 Lajos Kovács (runner), Hungarian athlete